Sophomoric humor is that which is juvenile and puerile. It is a type of comedy that often includes toilet humor and gags that are based on an appeal to a silly sense of immaturity. The word sophomoric, an adjective dating from 1813, is used to refer to and describe something or someone that is conceited, overconfident, poorly informed and immature, as characterized by a stereotypical sophomore. The phrase can be derisive, but is also used to refer to a style or vein of comedic act.

In British English, an equivelent term is schoolboy humour.

Examples
A critique of John Steinbeck's The Short Reign of Pippin IV by Peter Lisca describes the story as lacking the burlesque humor of Tortilla Flat, the Rabelaisian humor of "St. Katy the Virgin," the folk humor of The Grapes of Wrath, the tender humor of Cannery Row, the "terrible" Swiftian humor of The Wayward Bus, and (instead) consisting of "a sophomoric humor of grotesque improbability and wordplay." Thomas Pynchon is an example of a writer who mixes high brow literature with sophomoric humor.

British comic Viz has been described as juvenile and profane.

American film director Judd Apatow's work, including The 40 Year Old Virgin, Knocked Up and Funny People, has been described as using sophomoric humor, drawing laughs for jokes about sex, penises, and bodily functions.

References

Humour